William Henry Hunt Gleason (July 4, 1862 – 1949) was a one-term Republican mayor of Eau Gallie, Florida from December 1920 to December 1921.

He was born in Baltimore, Maryland, the son of William Henry Gleason, founder of Eau Gallie, and 2nd Lieutenant Governor of Florida and Sarah Griffin Gleason. He married Flora Belle Lansing in 1897 in Eau Gallie, where he was a real estate agent.

William H. H. and his brother George G. Gleason incorporated a land development company, Gleason Brothers in 1899. The Gleason brothers also opened an intracoastal shipping business and operated steamships, and dry dock facilities. Both of the brothers were licensed pilots. William also became a lawyer, and took over his father's law practice.

His mother, Sarah, left the William H. Gleason House to him in 1912.

He was the father of William Lansing Gleason, who also served as mayor of Eau Gallie.

Along with William Jackson Creel, he served as a trustee of Eau Gallie Schools.

References

External links 
 Old Pineapple Inn - website of the Gleason House

1862 births
1949 deaths
American school administrators
Florida Republicans
Mayors of Melbourne, Florida
Politicians from Baltimore
American real estate brokers
Steamship captains
Florida lawyers
People from Eau Gallie, Florida